Vignes is an unincorporated community located in the town of Clay Banks in Door County, Wisconsin. County Highway OO is the main highway to Vignes and connects to County Highway U.

References

Unincorporated communities in Wisconsin
Unincorporated communities in Door County, Wisconsin